Pipra is a genus of bird in the family Pipridae.

Pipra may also refer to:

A place in Maithili where pipar or peepal tree are abundantly found.

Places

India
Villages in Pashchim Champaran district, Bihar

 Gaunaha taluka
 Pipra, Gaunaha (census code 216364)
 Pipra, Gaunaha (census code 216412)
 Pipra, Gaunaha (census code 216433)
 Narkatiaganj taluka
 Pipra, Narkatiaganj (census code 216588)
 Pipra, Narkatiaganj (census code 216695)
 Pipra, Narkatiaganj (census code 216737)
 Ramnagar taluka
 Pipra, Ramnagar (census code 216190)
 Pipra, Ramnagar (census code 216269)
 Pipra, Ramnagar (census code 216279)
 Sidhaw taluka
 Pipra, Sidhaw (census code 215992)
 Pipra, Sidhaw (census code 216009)
 Pipra, Sidhaw (census code 216093)
 Pipra, Sidhaw (census code 216155)
 Other talukas
 Pipra, Bagaha (census code 216878)
 Pipra, Mainatanr (census code 216513)
Pipra block, Jharkhand

Nepal
Pipra, Mahottari, a village development committee in Mahottari District
Pipra (Purba), a village in Kanchan Roop Municipality, Saptari District
Pipra (West), a village in Saptari District

Electoral constituencies
 Pipra, Purvi Champaran (Vidhan Sabha constituency)
 Pipra, Supaul (Vidhan Sabha constituency)